Bojd (also Romanized as Būjd and Bozhd; also known as Bojdī) is a village in Baqeran Rural District, in the Central District of Birjand County, South Khorasan Province, Iran. At the 2016 census, its population was 1,100, in 303 families.

References 

Populated places in Birjand County